NTT Docomo USA is a subsidiary  of NTT Docomo which operates in the United States.

Outline
NTT Docomo USA is the fully owned U.S. subsidiary of NTT Docomo, Inc. in Japan. Established on November 1, 1999, its headquarters were originally located in San Jose, California. As of July 9, 2001, the USA headquarters were officially moved to New York City. With offices in New York, Washington DC, and a research lab facility in San Jose, California.

Docomo USA Wireless
NTT Docomo USA began its Docomo USA Wireless service as a Mobile Virtual Network Operator (MVNO) on April 6, 2011. Their partnership with T-Mobile was updated in September 2013. The mobile phone service targets the Japanese market in the U.S.

Mobile devices
Nokia 2720
Nokia 2730
Motorola WX345
BlackBerry Curve 3G 9300
BlackBerry Curve 8520
Google Nexus S
Galaxy Nexus
Nokia 500

See also 
 List of public corporations by market capitalization
 List of largest companies by revenue
 List of telephone operating companies
 List of United States telephone companies

References

External links
 
 Docomo USA Wireless 

Mobile virtual network operators
Mobile phone companies of the United States
NTT Docomo
American subsidiaries of foreign companies
Companies based in New York City